AKM Fazlul Haque Politician of Naogaon District of Bangladesh and former member of Parliament for Naogaon-1 constituency in 1988.

Career 
Haque was elected to parliament from Naogaon-1 as an independent candidate in 1988.

References 

Living people
Year of birth missing (living people)
People from Naogaon District
Bangladeshi politicians